Ian Francis Kelly (born 16 January 1966) is a British writer and actor. His works include historical biographies, stage and screenplays.

Early life
Born in Cambridge, England, in 1966, Kelly is the second son of Professor Donald Kelly and Patricia Ann Kelly. He was brought up in Philadelphia, Bristol, and the Wirral. Kelly studied at Cambridge University and UCLA Film School.

Playwright
Kelly’s play  'Mr Foote's Other Leg', directed by Sir Richard Eyre and starring Simon Russell Beale, opened at Hampstead Theatre in 2015 before transferring directly into the West End, Theatre Royal Haymarket, playing 2015-2016.

Acting
He played Hermione Granger's father in Harry Potter and the Deathly Hallows - Part 1. He appeared in The Pitmen Painters at the National Theatre, on Broadway and in the West End and A Busy Day, also in the West End. He acted on London's West End and in New York in his own one-man plays and also the US premiere of Ron Hutchinson's ‘’Beau Brummell’’ in the title role. He was nominated for Best Actor for his work in Tom Stoppard's Arcadia (Manchester Drama Awards). For his work in Alexei Balabanov's Voyna (War), shot in Chechnya and the Caucasus, he was nominated for Best Actor at the Montreal World Film Festival.
He appeared in the premiere production of his play Mr Foote’s Other Leg in 2015, playing George III.

Historian and Biographer
Kelly has published biographies of Antonin Careme (2004), Beau Brummell (2005), Casanova (2008), and Samuel Foote (Mr. Foote's Other Leg, 2012). His biography of Vivienne Westwood, written with Dame Vivienne, was published in October 2014.

Adaptations
The BBC Television drama Beau Brummell: This Charming Man with Hugh Bonneville and Phil Davis was based on Ian Kelly’s biography.  
His biography of Giacomo Casanova was read by Benedict Cumberbatch on BBC Radio 4 in 2008 as a Book of the Week abridged by Amber Barnfather, repeated on BBC Radio 4 Extra, then published by BBC Worldwide as an audio book in May 2015. He wrote the scenario of Casanova for a 2017 ballet choreographed by Kenneth Tindall for Northern Ballet which was also performed at Sadler's Wells Theatre.

Awards
Mr. Foote's Other Leg, was named Best Theatre Book by the Society for Theatre Research UK in May 2013. His biography of Beau Brummell was shortlisted for the Marsh Biography Award. His biography of Casanova was the Sunday Times Biography of the Year 2008-9.

Journalism
Kelly has written for most of the British broadsheets and the New York Times. He is a contributing editor of Food Arts Magazine.

Television
As an actor his TV work includes Dennis Potter's Cold Lazarus  Drop the Dead Donkey, Silent Witness, Just William, Catherine Cookson's The Moth, Sensitive Skin, and Time Trumpet.

Film
Kelly has acted in many films including The Children Act, Closed, Creation, Merchant-Ivory's Howards End, Richard Attenborough's In Love and War, The Mission, The King's Man and the Russian films Admiral and Aleksei Balabanov's War.

Bibliography

References

External links
 
 
Patron of Educational Wealth Fund (2018)

Alumni of Trinity Hall, Cambridge
UCLA Film School alumni
British non-fiction writers
1966 births
21st-century British male actors
British male film actors
British male television actors
20th-century British male actors
British male writers
Male non-fiction writers
Living people